The Small Business Act for Europe  (SBA) is an act designed to assist small businesses.

Background
In June 2008, the European Commission adopted a communiqué titled "Small Business Act" for Europe to the European Council, European Parliament, European Economic and Social Committee, and the Committee of the Regions. Its aim was to provide an SME policy framework to improve competitiveness and promote entrepreneurship. Rather than being a legislative Act, it contains provisions applying to small firms, directed at governments and institutions to "think small first" when establishing policy and law.

Content
The SBA invites the Commission and Member States to adopt:
 ten principles to guide policy-making
 legislative proposals guided by the "think small first" principle: the General Block Exemption Regulation on State Aids; Regulation providing for a Statute for a European Private Company; Directive on reduced VAT rates
 policy measures that implement the ten principles at the Community and Member State levels.

The SBA applies to independent companies with fewer than 250 employees (99% of EU businesses). It provides an "SME test" to ensure SMEs are taken into account at an early stage of the policy-making process. As such, all new administrative or legislative proposals are to be subjected to an SME impact review. Countries including Belgium, Finland, Denmark, and Germany have added this test into their national decision-making processes. The Act also carries a provision to appoint SME envoys, the role of which is to liaise between the EC and SMEs. The SBA promotes the Erasmus for Young Entrepreneurs program (participants spend up to six months working in a different country's SME), and creates Market Access Teams in select export markets, particularly China and India.

External links 
 http://ec.europa.eu/growth/smes/business-friendly-environment/small-business-act/index_en.htm

References

European Union laws